Parents' Day is observed in South Korea on May 8 and in the United States on the fourth Sunday of July. The South Korean designation was established in 1973, replacing the Mother's Day previously marked on May 8, and includes public and private celebrations. The United States day was created in 1994 under President Bill Clinton. June 1 has also been proclaimed as "Global Day of Parents" by the United Nations as a mark of appreciation for the commitment of parents towards their children. In the Philippines, while it is not strictly observed or celebrated, the first Monday of December each year is proclaimed as Parents' Day.

International
The United Nations proclaimed June 1 to be the Global Day of Parents "to appreciate all parents in all parts of the world for their selfless commitment to children and their lifelong sacrifice towards nurturing this relationship".

In the United States

In the United States, Parents' Day is held on the fourth Sunday of July. This was established in 1994 when President Bill Clinton signed a Congressional Resolution into law for "recognizing, uplifting, and supporting the role of parents in the rearing of children." The bill was introduced by Republican Senator Trent Lott. It was supported by members of the Unification Church which also celebrates a holiday called Parents' Day, although on a different date. Parents' Day is celebrated throughout the United States.

In South Korea

In South Korea, Parents' Day ( Eobeoinal) is annually held on May 8. Parents' Day is celebrated by both the public and the government. Family events focus on the parents; popular actions include giving parents carnations. The ceremony to designate Parents' Day as an anniversary and to wear carnations originated in Christian culture in the United States. Western religion, culture, and Confucian ideas combined to make it a traditional holiday. Public events are led by the Ministry of Health and Welfare and include public celebrations and awards.

The origins of Parents' Day can be traced back to the 1930s. Starting in 1930, some Christian communities began to celebrate Mother's Day or Parents' Day. This tradition was combined with Korea's traditional Confucianism culture to eventually establish Mother's Day. In 1956, the State Council of South Korea designated May 8 as an annual Mother's Day. However, the question of Father's Day was discussed and on March 30, 1973, May 8 was designated as Parents' Day under Presidential Decree 6615, or the Regulations Concerning Various Holidays (각종 기념일 등에 관한 규정). When Parents' Day was first established, the entire week with the 8th day was designated to be a week to respect the elderly, but respecting elders in the month of May was abolished in 1997 with October becoming the month designated for respecting the elderly.

In the Philippines

Mothers' Day is traditionally celebrated on the first Monday of December. On this day, children placed pink cadena de amor on their chest. Children who no longer have mothers place white cadena de amor.

In 1921, Circular No. 33 designating the first Monday every December as Mothers' day was issued, as a response to the appeal Ilocos Norte Federation of Woman's Clubs. During the Philippine Commonwealth Government, then President Quezon issued Proclamation No. 213, s. 1937 declaring the day designated as Mothers'  Day as Parents' Day. This was due to finding petitions to set a special date for Fathers’ Day not advisable as there are already set of numerous holidays set, and deeming it more fitting to celebrate both Mothers' and Fathers' Day together and not apart. In 1980, a proclamation was issued declaring first Sunday and the first Monday of December as Father's Day and Mother's Day respectively. In 1988, the issued presidential proclamation followed the international day of celebration of Father's and Mother's Day which most Filipinos are familiar with. However, then President Estrada tried to revive the tradition through Proclamation No. 58, s. 1998.

In the Democratic Republic of the Congo 

In the Democratic Republic of the Congo, Parents’ Day, also called Siku ya Wazazi in Swahili, is one of the public holidays especially celebrated on August 1 each year. This day is devoted to honor the role played by mothers and fathers in the Congolese society and the significance of the family unit.
The origin of this celebration is attributed to Mobutu in 1979 who decided to replace All Saints' Day, a vestige of the colonial era, with this holiday now dedicated to parents and ancestors in general. Early in the morning, people go to clean up the cemeteries in remembrance of the deceased relatives before giving cards and gifts to their parents.
The main reason for this elevated occasion is that, in the Congo, families habitually tend to be big - six children per woman on average – whereas the worldwide average is less than half that. This accentuates the traditional roles of parents, which is to look after and provide for the family as numerous as it may be. Culturally, parents are not only the individual that gave you birth and brought you up to face this challenging world. They are all those who placed the building blocks of your life.  Thus, this is the unique day consecrated to relax and think of parents with beautiful gifts that make them realize that they are not taken for granted but, in the contrary, are loved and cared for.

Elsewhere
In India, Parents' Worship Day is celebrated on 14th February.

See also

 Father's Day
 Mother's Day
 Grandparents Day
 Public holidays in the United States
 Public holidays in South Korea
 List of International observances

References

External links
National Parents' Day Coalition 
White House press release proclaiming Sunday, July 23, 2006 as Parents' Day

May observances
June observances
July observances
Family member holidays
Holidays and observances by scheduling (nth weekday of the month)
Observances in South Korea
Observances in the United States
Spring (season) events in South Korea
United Nations days